The Trademark Trial and Appeal Board Manual of Procedure (TBMP) is a manual published by the United States Patent and Trademark Office (USPTO) for use by trademark attorneys litigating cases before the Trademark Trial and Appeal Board. It provides basic information generally useful for litigating these cases, including current practice and procedure as of the date the manual is issued. It is devoted primarily to opposition and cancellation proceedings.

See also
Trademark Manual of Examining Procedure

External links
Trademark Trial and Appeal Board Manual of Procedure

United States trademark law
Publications of the United States government
United States civil procedure